The 1986 San Jose mayoral election was held on June 3, 1986 to elect the mayor of San Jose, California. It saw the reelection of Tom McEnery. Because McEnrery won an outright majority in the initial round of the election, no runoff election needed to be held.

Candidates
Dante De Amicis
Tom McEnery, incumbent mayor
Dan Minutillo, lawyer
Greg Nelson

Results

References

San Jose
San Jose
1986